Eugene Linden may refer to:

 Eugene Linden (author), American non-fiction author
 Eugene Linden (conductor) (1912–1983), American conductor